Malagigi can refer to:

 Maugris, hero of chansons de geste as named in Italian Renaissance epics
 Marc'Antonio Pasqualini (1614-1691), Italian castrato singer